The Waldorf Astoria Hotel and Residences is a skyscraper currently under construction in Miami, Florida. It is the first supertall building (>300 meters or 1,000 ft) to begin construction in Florida, out of several that have been proposed in Miami in the 21st century. It is planned to rise to the maximum on allowable height in downtown Miami of 1,049 ft (320 meters) above sea level, or about 1,040 ft (317 meters) above ground, making it easily the tallest building in Miami and Florida. Construction began in late 2022 and is expected to complete in 2026. It is located on Biscayne Boulevard between NE 3rd and 4th Streets in the Central business district of Greater Downtown Miami, across from Bayfront Park. The design is inspired by stacked and cantilevered boxes. It will have nearly 100 floors of condominium and hotel space, topped by a five floor penthouse with over

See also
List of tallest buildings in Miami
List of tallest buildings in Florida

References

Buildings and structures under construction in the United States